The University of São Paulo (USP) is a public university in the Brazilian state of São Paulo. It is the largest Brazilian public university and the country's most prestigious educational institution, the best university in Ibero-America, and holds a high reputation among world universities, being ranked 100 worldwide in reputation by the Times Higher Education World University Rankings. The USP is involved in teaching, research and university extension in all areas of knowledge, offering a broad range of courses.

The university was founded in 1934, regrouping already existing schools in the state of São Paulo, such as the Faculdade de Direito do Largo de São Francisco (Faculty of Law), the Escola Politécnica (Engineering School) and the Escola Superior de Agricultura Luiz de Queiroz (College of Agriculture). The university's foundation is marked by the creation in 1934 of the Faculdade de Filosofia, Ciências e Letras (Faculty of Philosophy, Sciences and Literature, 1934–1968), and has subsequently created new departments, becoming one of the largest institutions of higher education in Latin America, with approximately 90,000 enrolled students. Currently, it has eleven campuses, four of them in the city of São Paulo. The remaining campuses are in the cities of Bauru, Lorena, Piracicaba, Pirassununga, Ribeirão Preto and two in São Carlos.

Several students from the University of São Paulo have achieved important positions in Brazilian society. It was the alma mater of thirteen Brazilian presidents, such as Fernando Henrique Cardoso and Michel Temer. The USP was ranked 19th worldwide in a rank based on the number of alumni who became CEOs in the world's 500 largest companies, and also classed in the top 100 worldwide in the Global Employability University Ranking. In terms of research, the USP is Brazil's largest research institution, producing more than 25% of the scientific papers published by Brazilian researchers in high quality conferences and journals. In 2015, out of 36 subjects, the QS World University Rankings ranked USP in the top 50 in eight subjects (including Architecture, Geography, Dentistry, Civil Engineering, Agriculture/Forestry, Art/Design and Veterinary Science) and in the top 51-100th position in 21 more subjects (including Computer Science, Mechanical, Electrical and Chemical Engineering, Modern Languages, Physics, Chemistry and Mathematics). According to the SCImago Institutions Ranking 2021, the USP was ranked 26º (twenty sixth) worldwide in the first quarter of 2021. Over the years, QS also consistently ranked USP among the top 5 universities in the Latin world.

History

After its defeat in the Constitutionalist Revolution, São Paulo needed institutional improvements. Therefore, in 1933 a group of businessmen founded the Free School of Sociology and Politics (ELSP) (the current Foundation of the School of Sociology and Politics in São Paulo). In 1934, the intervenor of São Paulo (which corresponded to the governor), Armando de Sales Oliveira, founded the University of São Paulo (USP).

That was one of the efforts carried out to provide Brazil with modern administrative, educational, and military institutions in a period known as "search for alternatives". One of the main initiatives included the founding, that same year, of the University of São Paulo. Its nucleus was the School of Philosophy, Sciences, and Languages, with professors coming from France, Italy, Spain, Germany and other European countries. The ELSP assumed the goal of administrative elites to form a new model in which they noted an increasing role of the state, while the USP focused on training teachers for secondary schools, experts in sciences, engineers, lawyers, physicians and professors. The ELSP followed a sociological American model, while the USP used the French academic world as its main source of inspiration.

Foreign professors such as Claude Lévi-Strauss (France), Fernand Braudel (France), Roger Bastide (France), Robert H. Aubreton (France), Heinrich Rheinboldt (Germany), Paul Arbousse Bastide (France), Jean Magüé (France), Martial Gueroult (France), Emilio Willems (Germany), Donald Pierson (USA), Gleb Vassielievich Wataghin (Russia), Pierre Monbeig (France), Giacomo Albanese (Italy), Luigi Fantappiè (Italy), Vilém Flusser (Czech Republic), Giuseppe Ungaretti (Italy) and Herbert Baldus (Germany), broadcast in various institutions new standards for teaching and research, creating new generations of scientists in Brazil.

Since its foundation the USP received professors and researchers from all over the world, such as David Bohm (USA), Giuseppe Occhialini (Italy), François Châtelet (France), Anatol Rosenfeld (Germany), Helmi Nasr (Egypt), Gérard Lebrun (France), Fritz Köberle (Austria), Alexander Grothendieck (France), and Heinz Dieter Heidemann (Germany).

Origins

The University of São Paulo is the result of a combination of the newly founded School of Philosophy, Sciences and Languages (Faculdade de Filosofia, Ciências e Letras, FFCL, currently the Faculty of Philosophy, Languages and Human Sciences – Faculdade de Filosofia, Letras e Ciências Humanas, FFLCH) with the existing Polytechnic School of Engineering (founded in 1893), the Luiz de Queiroz College of Agriculture (Escola Superior de Agricultura Luiz de Queiroz) (founded in 1901), the Medical School (founded in 1912), the traditional Law School (founded in 1827), the old School of Pharmacy and Dentistry (founded in 1898), the Institute of Astronomy, Geophysics and Atmospheric Sciences (founded in 1886), and the School of Veterinary Medicine (founded in 1919).

The FFCL emerged as the integrating element of the university, bringing together courses in various areas of knowledge. Also in 1934 the School of Physical Education (sports science) of the State of São Paulo was created, the first civil school of physical education in Brazil, which would later be part of the university. In 1944 the Medical School opened its public hospital (Hospital das Clínicas da Universidade de São Paulo). In the same year, the School of Engineering of Sao Carlos (EESC) emerged. In subsequent years several other research units were also created, such as a second Medical School, located in the city of Ribeirão Preto (São Paulo's inland) in 1952.

In the 1960s, the university gradually transferred the headquarters of some of its units to the City University Armando de Salles Oliveira, in São Paulo. In 1963, the Heart Institute of the University of São Paulo was founded. Thereafter new institutes and schools were created, for instance the School of Journalism, Communications and Arts (ECA) in 1966. Over the years, some of the university's old departments were transformed into autonomous faculties or institutes, such as the Institute of Biomedical Sciences (ICB), the Institute of Geosciences (IGc) and the Institute of Biosciences (IB) in 1969.

Military dictatorship

During the 1970s and part of the 1980s, some critics believe that the USP underwent an intellectual dissection, both in terms of knowledge production and the quality of human resources. During the past decades, the university played an essential role in the discussion and dissemination of important political ideas that contributed to the democratization of the country, bringing together many leftist intellectuals (such as Florestan Fernandes, Boris Fausto, Paul Singer, Antonio Candido, Gioconda Mussolini among others).

During the Brazilian dictatorship a large number of professors from the USP were persecuted and even tortured – many were forced to leave the country. This slowed down scientific production in Brazil. It also promoted a systematic increase in the total number of graduate vacancies, encouraged by the state government.

The gap caused by the removal of teachers and students chased by the military regime was interrupted with the campaign of political amnesty, since the early 1980s. Several units of USP celebrated the return of their deposed professors, although many of them were rehired in a different set of conditions (former full professors took new positions as assistant professors).

Expansion
Parallel to the resulting intellectual emptiness of political repression in the 1960s-80s, a process of fragmentation of the academic units occurred, new faculties were created and new institutes, which resulted in new courses, new lines of research and graduate programs. Originally conceived as the academic core of the university – gathering itself the various fields of knowledge – the FFCL (School of Philosophy, Sciences and Letters) saw its departments gain autonomy and become separate units. The Institute of Physics was the first department to extricate itself from the old FFCL, followed also by other departments of natural science.

In 2004, the university founded the Institute of International Relations, with the aim to study global matters in a multidisciplinary environment (law, political science, economy, and history) with Brazilian and international students and professors (International Exchange Program). In 2005, it was built in the East Zone of the city of São Paulo a new School of Arts, Sciences and Humanities (EACH), taking a few courses that go beyond traditional Brazilian university model and aim to diversify the areas of the consolidated institution. [22] On 21 March 2006, the USP approved the merger of a second School of Chemical Engineering (FAENQUIL) in the city of Lorena (rural area), at the Paraíba Valley (State of São Paulo's rural area), with about 1,600 students in total and of these 1,200 at graduation. In 2007, a second Law School was established in the city of Ribeirão Preto, also in the State of São Paulo's countryside.

Academics

Today the USP has five hospitals and offers 247 undergraduate programs and 239 graduate programs in all areas of study. The university houses altogether 24 museums and galleries – with half a million visitors a year – two theaters, a cinema, a TV channel and an orchestra. The University of São Paulo welcomes people from all continents and stimulates this process via networks and consortiums (International Office – USP), such as Erasmus Mundus, Associação das Universidades de Língua Portuguesa, and Rede Magalhães (SMILE – Student Mobility in Latin America, Caribbean and Europe), among others.

Rankings
According to ARWU, the USP was classified in the first place, regarding the number of doctorates awarded during 2011. USP is ranked among the top 70 universities in the world, in the Ranking "Top Universities by Reputation 2013" published by Times Higher Education. According to the 2013 Academic Ranking of World Universities, the USP is placed in the group of the 101–151 top world universities. According to the 2020 CWTS Leiden Ranking, the University of São Paulo is ranked 7th in the world. In the 2022 QS World University Rankings, the University of São Paulo ranked 121st in the world and is ranked 2nd in Latin America. As of 2021, the University of São Paulo is the first Latin American institution in the Times Higher Education World University Rankings to be ranked at 201-250th.

Healthcare

The USP operates four hospitals, among them University of São Paulo Medical School Public Hospital, the largest hospital complex in Latin America and the major teaching and training site for the university's Faculty of Medicine, which is highly ranked within Latin America.

 University of São Paulo Medical School Public Hospital
 Heart Institute of the University of São Paulo
 Public Hospital of Ribeirão Preto Medical School
 Hospital de Reabilitação de Anomalias Craniofaciais – Centrinho

Library system

The USP has 42 libraries managed by the Integrated Library System (SIB – Sistema Integrado de Bibliotecas in Portuguese), which is also responsible for the university's online system, DEDALUS.

Dedalus is an online database that allows simultaneous consultation in all libraries in the university. Dedalus is also integrated to a system named Integrated Research which integrates all online databases signed by the university. That makes academic researches faster and it provides researchers easy access to international publications.

Museums and art galleries
The University of São Paulo manages a rich set of museums and art galleries, most of them located on the central campus, in the city of São Paulo:
 Museu de Arte Contemporânea da Universidade de São Paulo (Museum of Contemporary Art)
 Museu Paulista (Historical Museum of São Paulo)
 Museu de Zoologia (Museum of Zoology)
 MAE-USP – Museu de Arqueologia e Etnologia (Museum of Archeology and Ethnology)
 Museu do Café Francisco Schmidt (Ribeirão Preto Campus)

Academic career
 Teaching Assistant (Auxiliar de Ensino) – MS-2 (must have a master's degree and be enrolled in a doctoral program). Undergraduate students can also be a teaching assistant for a semester, with scholarships from each department.
 Professor Doctor (Professor Doutor) – MS-3 (must have a doctoral or equivalent degree).
 Associate Professor (Professor Associado) – MS-5 (must have a Livre Docente title; equivalent to the German Habilitation).
 Full Professor (Professor Titular) – MS-6 (top rank, only MS-6 professors are allowed to hold positions such as the Dean of a Faculty/School or the Dean of the university).

Admissions

Brazilian students take the USP's entrance exam, the vestibular, which is prepared and administered by FUVEST (University Foundation for Vestibular), subject to regulations approved by the university's Undergraduate Studies Council. In 2012, 159,603 students signed up for Fuvest's vestibular, for a total of 10,982 openings. Candidates are required to take a multiple choice test involving chemistry, physics, mathematics, biology, geography, history, Portuguese and English. The second round of tests is written and specific to the chosen field of studies, including more-in-depth questions in physics, chemistry and mathematics for engineering; history, math and geography for law and so on. In-depth written Portuguese questions are required for all.

International students may come through several exchange programs. In 2012, the USP hosted over 2,300 exchange students. Roughly a third of the international students are enrolled in humanities and social sciences, with another third enrolled in engineering courses.

The USP does not require its students, national or foreigners, to pay any tuition, as its source of funding comes from São Paulo State.

Organization

The USP, like most Latin American universities, corresponds to the idea of "university" as a set of autonomous schools, institutes and colleges, each of which is responsible for one area of knowledge (the aforementioned thirty-six teaching, research and extension). And like most Brazilian universities, grants autonomy to its teaching, research and extension units regarding the didactic organization and curricular definition of each of the courses, which often results in a considered excessive fragmentation of teaching and the research and the disconnection between the knowledge produced in each of the units.

Each unit is divided into departments. A department usually is responsible for one of the courses offered by the unit or for a specific search line. In the case of units with only one or two courses, departments are not responsible for the entire course, but for a part of it. Due to the aforementioned fragmentation and decentralization of the university, it is common to see departments with similar profiles in different units, which raises criticism as to the effectiveness of public investments and duplication of efforts.

Administration
The administrative structure of the USP has in the Rectory its central organ, as well as in the Rector the main figure of the university. Subordinated to the Rectory are the four Pro-Rectorates, specialized agencies in each of the university's fields of activity: Pro-Rectorate (PRG), Post-Graduation Pro-Rectorate (PRPG), Pro-Rectory of Research (PRP) and Pro-Rectory of Culture and Extension (PRC).

In recent years there has been discussion about the creation of a Pro-Rectorate for Student Assistance, a subject that according to critics has always been considered secondary to the university's leaders.

In popular culture
 The USP is referenced in Bernardo Kucinski's 2011 novel, K'', a fictionalized account of the disappearance of an assistant lecturer in 1974, and her father's desperate attempt to find her.

See also
 Universidade Estadual de Campinas (Unicamp)
 Universidade Estadual Paulista Júlio de Mesquita Filho (Unesp)
 Rankings of universities in Brazil
 Universities and Higher Education in Brazil
 List of University of São Paulo alumni
 List of University of São Paulo faculty

Notes

References

External links

  
 International Cooperation Office – USP 
 Universidade de São Paulo – Universidades e Carreiras Online (Portuguese)
 List of undergraduate courses offered by USP (English)
 List of USP's Schools, Colleges and Institutes (English)
 Institute of Mathematics and Statistics (English)
 Dept. of Computer Science (English)

 
1934 establishments in Brazil
Educational institutions established in 1934
State universities in Brazil
Tourist attractions in São Paulo
Universities and colleges in São Paulo